Carson may refer to:

People
Carson (surname), people with the surname
Carson (given name), people with the given name

Places
In the United States
Carson, California, a city
Carson Township, Fayette County, Illinois
Carson, Iowa, a city
Carson, Kentucky, an unincorporated community
Carson City, Michigan
Carson Township, Minnesota
Carson, Mississippi, an unincorporated community
Carson, Missouri, a ghost town
Carson City, Nevada
Carson, New Mexico, an unincorporated community
Carson, North Dakota, a city
Carson, Oregon, an unincorporated community
Carson County, Texas
Carson, Virginia, an unincorporated community
Carson, Washington, an unincorporated community
Carson, Wisconsin, a town
Fort Carson, Colorado, a United States Army post
Carson Beach, South Boston, Massachusetts, a public beach
Carson Desert, Nevada
Carson National Forest, New Mexico
Carson Park (Eau Claire, Wisconsin)
Carson Pass, through the Sierra Nevada in California
Carson Range, a mountain range in California and Nevada
Carson River, in California and Nevada
Carson Sink, a large playa in Nevada
Carson Valley, Pennsylvania, an unincorporated community

Elsewhere
Carson Lake (disambiguation), various lakes in the United States and Canada
Carson River (Western Australia), Australia
Mount Carson, a subpeak of Pavilion Mountain, British Columbia, Canada
6572 Carson, an asteroid

Businesses
Carson's, an American retailer
Carson Helicopters, a heavy lift helicopter company based in Perkasie, Pennsylvania
Carson Productions, a television production company established by Johnny Carson

Schools
Carson College of Business, the business school of Washington State University in Pullman, Washington
Carson High School (disambiguation)
Carson College for Orphan Girls, Flourtown, Pennsylvania, now coeducational and named Carson Valley Children's Aid
Carson Middle School, Pittsburgh, Pennsylvania
Carson Elementary School (disambiguation)

In transportation
Carson (Los Angeles Metro station)
Carson (LYNX station), Charlotte, North Carolina

Other
Carson (band), a 1970s Australian blues rock and boogie rock band
Mr. Carson, a character in the Downton Abbey drama series

Carson?, a record by the Gaelic punk group Oi Polloi
Carson top, after-market car-top

See also
Carson House (disambiguation)
Carsen